Power Computing Corporation (often referred to as Power Computing) was the first company selected by Apple Inc to create Macintosh-compatible computers ("Mac clones").  Stephen “Steve” Kahng, a computer engineer best known for his design of the Leading Edge Model D, founded the company in November 1993.  Power Computing started out with financial backing from Olivetti (US$5 million) and $4 million of Mr. Kahng's money.

The first Mac-compatible (clone) PC shipped in May 1995. Like Dell Computer, Power Computing followed a direct, build-to-order sales model. In one year, Power Computing shipped 100,000 units with revenues of $250 million in the first year.  Power Computing was the first company to sell $1,000,000 of products on the Internet.

Power Computing released upgraded models until 1997 with revenues reaching $400 million a year.  The Mac clone business was stopped after Steve Jobs returned as interim CEO of Apple in July 1997.  In September, Apple bought the core assets of Power Computing for $100 million in Apple stock and terminated the Mac cloning business.

History

Power Computing Corporation was founded on 11 November 1993 in Milpitas, California, backed by $5 million from Olivetti and $4 million of Mr. Kahng's money. At the MacWorld Expo in January 1995, just days after receiving notice he had the license to clone Macintosh computers, Kahng enlisted Mac veteran Michael Shapiro to help build the company. Shapiro helped to develop the original logo and brand and worked with Kahng to build the initial management team. Power Computing opened  manufacturing and operations offices in Austin, Texas at the recently abandoned facilities of CompuAdd and engineering offices in Cupertino, California, staffed largely by members of Apple's original Power Macintosh team.  In 1997, PCC relocated its headquarters to a location directly across I-35 from Dell's main campus, and remained there until Apple acquired PCC's assets in 1997. Mr. Kahng set out to create a simplified Mac design that made it cheaper and faster to produce the machines. He then targeted the mail-order market, where Power Computing could get a quicker return on its money than it could by selling through distributors.

 "With direct mail, you get your money back in days by credit card instead of the 30 to 60 days it takes for the resale channel to repay," Mr. Kahng said.

At that time, Apple was leaning towards giving licenses to big time computer makers. Initially, even with Mr. Kahng's reputation as a "master cloner", getting Apple to take him seriously was a challenge.  He ended up bringing Olivetti people with him to meetings. Apple engineers gave him the help he needed to make a Mac prototype.  The team reduced the size of the Apple main circuit board so that it could fit into a standard PC box.  They also used off-the-shelf PC power supplies and monitors.

A few days before the end of the year, it was announced that Apple Computer picked Power Computing to be its first Macintosh clone maker. Jim Gable, Apple's director of Mac licensing was quoted in The Wall Street Journal saying "[Mr. Kahng] is clever and fleet of foot.  We want him to succeed."

Power Computing's goal was to have clones available for as little as $1,000 each starting in March or April 1995. John C. Dvorak, a computer columnist at MacUser magazine, remarked, "Apple is not going to know what hit them.  Stephen Kahng is tenacious." When the machine was released, Macworld's review said

 “The first clones work as well as Apple's Macs. That alone represents an auspicious start to Apple's reversal of its decade-long go-it-alone strategy. Although these first clones introduce no compelling new technologies, breathtaking features, or stunning industrial designs, they prove that Mac clones can be legitimate alternatives to Apple's own Macs.”

Initial machines 

The initial clones were available in desktop and tower configurations, and were based on the PowerPC 601 80 MHz, 100 MHz and 110 MHz microprocessors. They were comparable to Apple Computer's Power Macintosh 7100 and 8100 class of computers. Pricing ranged from $1,995–2,899.

 “Power Computing's system design (except for the clock-oscillator chip that controls the CPU and bus speed, the two models' motherboards are identical) suggests a thoughtful, sophisticated approach. This sophistication derives, in part, from help from Apple, as well as from the fact that two key Apple engineers recently joined Power Computing.”
 
Unlike Apple at the time, Power Computing pressed for direct sales. After a customer placed an order for a semi-customized configuration, the system was delivered the next day. Following the delivery of the system, Power Computing called the customer to surmise their needs and offer technical support and customer service. In addition, Power Computing set a goal of a 3-minute response time for all inquiries.

In May 1995, shortly after the original clone announcement, Power Computing teamed up with Austin, Texas based Metrowerks to offer the Power Computing CodeStation. The CodeStation was a package consisting of the recently announced Power Series clone, rebranded and bundled with the latest PowerPC version of CodeWarrior (CW6 Gold which introduced Magic Cap support). CodeStations were sold through Metrowerks at discounted developer prices and it is unknown exactly how many units were sold.

At the end of July 1995, Power Computing announced that it had successfully ramped the volume production capability of its Power 100 system. The efficiencies provided by volume production allowed Power Computing to lower the base configuration price of a "Power 100 Starter System" to $1,699. In addition, the company instigated a comprehensive quick-ship program that allowed popular configurations to ship the same day.  Power Computing advertised models up to the "Power 120 XL", a $5,499 machine built around the PowerPC 601+ chip, a 2GB SCSI hard drive, 17 inch Sony monitor, 4X-speed CD-ROM, built-in Ethernet, and 32MB RAM.

At the end of October 1995, Power Computing introduced the world's fastest Macintosh-compatible computer, the PowerWave, based on the PowerPC 604 microprocessor. Per an article in the Austin American-Statesman, Power Computing said its machine would far outperform Windows-compatible machines based on Intel's Pentium processors.

At the early 1996 Macworld trade show in San Francisco, Power Computing found itself the star attraction because Apple was so preoccupied with its mounting financial woes that then-CEO Michael Spindler cancelled an appearance. PCC got another break when a computer firm that had spent $170,000 erecting an immense booth pulled out at the last moment, allowing Mr. Kahng to pick up the prime exhibiting space for $30,000.

At that Macworld, the PowerCurve — a line of mid-range, CPU-upgradeable Mac OS systems based on the PowerPC 601 and the industry-standard PCI expansion bus — was introduced. Unique to the PowerCurve 601/120 was the native support of VGA–style monitors.

Market success 
In May 1996, just one year after Power Computing started selling Mac clones, the company reached the 100,000 units sold milestone.  The number of employees had grown to 300.  And as noted in an article in The Wall Street Journal (WSJ) by Jim Carlton, Power CEO Steve Kahng “still hasn’t taken his (golf) clubs out of the bag” (he had vowed not to play another round of his beloved golf until he had shipped the first 30,000 Mac clones).

That same WSJ article noted that one-half of Power Computings's customers represent people who would have otherwise purchased a computer from Apple. The others are people who might have bought a non-Mac computer.

 There is no question Apple is losing sales to us, but we are also expanding the Mac market," says Geoff Burr, Power Computing's vice president of sales and marketing.

 Still, unless Apple can rapidly expand its cloning operations -- a goal of new Apple CEO Gilbert Amelio -- to boost flagging Mac market share and generate enough new licensing and software revenue to offset sales lost to cloners, Apple could see its belated cloning campaign backfire.In June 1996, Mr. Kahng persuaded a unit of Lockheed Martin Corp. to buy 3,000 of his computers rather than Apple's. Though a longtime Apple customer, Lockheed Martin said Power beat out Apple's bid by agreeing to such extras as loading in special engineering software before shipping the machines out, a request that Apple declined.  This was the largest sale in the history of Macs or Mac-compatible computers at the time.

Kahng was able to leverage his strong relationship with IBM to get access to the fastest PowerPC processors sooner than anyone else.  As a result, starting in April 1996 and continuing through 1997, Power Computing regularly put out the fastest computer system in either platform (Mac OS or WinTel).

 In April 1996, Power Computing unveiled the PowerTower, based on the 180 MHz and 166 MHz PowerPC 604 processor (announced by IBM on the same day). These were the fastest Mac OS personal computers available at the time.
 Three months later, in July 1996, Power Computing was back with an even faster system – the PowerTower Pro which marked the worldwide debut of the new PowerPC 604e microprocessor featuring clock speeds of up to 225 MHz, making the PowerTower Pro the fastest personal computer available.
 May 27, 1997 – PowerTower Pro 250 outperformed all comparable Pentium and Pentium II class Windows-based systems that were shipping at the time.
 Aug. 4, 1997 – PowerTower Pro G3 275 and PowerTower Pro G3 250 would have been the world's first desktop systems using the new PowerPC generation of processors except that they were never built.

At Macworld Expo 1997, the company presented a military-themed campaign that urged the Mac faithful to “Fight Back.” Power Computing employees were outfitted in camouflage. The video wall looped “why we fight” propaganda.  And “Steve Says” posters, flyers and T-shirts were ubiquitous inside the Moscone Center as well as in the streets surrounding the convention center (where Power Computing logoed Hummers, with bullhorns blazing, circled the center). However, the end was near.

 Acquisition by Apple 
In July, Apple's CEO Gil Amelio was ousted by Apple's Board of Directors, and Steve Jobs soon returned as interim CEO.  Jobs believed that Apple had started to license clones too late to repeat the business model pioneered by Microsoft in the early 1980s.

 "Apple has to let go of this ghost and invent the future," Mr. Jobs said. Instead of expanding the share of the market that used computers based on the Macintosh system, the decision to license clones simply ate into Apple's own sales of hardware, he said.

At MacWorld Boston in August, Power Computing President Joel Kocher unsuccessfully tried to convince attendees to rally against Apple's stiff new licensing policies. He and other executives resigned soon afterwards as Power Computing's board chose to be acquired instead.

On September 2, 1997, Apple Computer bought key assets of Power Computing for more than $100 million in Apple stock and roughly $10 million in cash. As part of the deal, Power Computing became an Apple subsidiary and Apple got back the license that allowed Power Computing to sell Macintosh-based machines. Apple also got some engineers and other employees that were absorbed into Apple's workforce; the rest were laid off. Some of them helped created Apple's next generation of technologies like the iMac.

Originally, Power Computing announced that they would be spun off by Apple and start making Wintel clones. However, Power Computing was forced to halt operations in December 1997, when the company was hit with lawsuits from its suppliers. As the parent company, Apple had to settle the lawsuits out of court and pay undisclosed amounts of money on behalf of Power Computing. As a result, Apple decided to instead absorb Power Computing into Apple and sell off any assets. By late January 1998, the last of Power Computing's physical assets were auctioned off, and Power Computing shareholders were mailed Apple Computer shares representing their pro rata share in the now-defunct corporation.

Anyone who had a Power Computing Macintosh clone was given a free upgrade up to Mac OS 8.1 by Apple under the Power Computing name. Ironically, this made Power Computing one of two Macintosh clones to get a Mac OS 8 upgrade disk (the other was UMAX, which got it under an agreement with Apple). Apple continued to provide technical support for any Power Computing machine until December 31, 2004.

Machine Upgrades
Power Computing's machines were one of the most popular Macintosh clone to ever be made. Any 603 or 604 equipped Power Computing machine can officially go up to Mac OS 8.1 due to Apple providing users of Power Computing machines Mac OS 8 upgrade disks as part of the acquisition (most other Macintosh clones can only officially go up to Mac OS 7.6). However, despite officially only going up to Mac OS 8.1, any 603 or 604 equipped Power Computing machine is capable of being upgraded up to Mac OS 9.1, although this is not officially supported by Apple.

Powered by a PowerPC 603e or a 604e processor, Power Computing's machines cannot run Mac OS X natively, but with the addition of a G3 or G4 processor upgrade and the use of XPostFacto 4.0, they could run several versions of Mac OS X up to 10.4 Tiger, with some limitations.

A number of Power Computing community websites have appeared over the years.

See also
 Macintosh clone

Notes

References

 Power Computing press releases (issued via BusinessWire)
 Markoff, John. "For Apple, Clones and Competition." The New York Times 29 December 1994
 Egan, Diane. "Mac Attack Begins: Apple Licenses OS."  Electronic Buyers' News 2 January 1995
 Rebello, Kathy. "IT JUST MAY BE THE YEAR OF THE APPLE It's leaner, it's signing up clone makers-and the Intel and Windows woes won't hurt a bit."  Business Week 16 January 1995
 Piller, Charles. "First clones. (Power Computing Macintosh clones; other upcoming clone machines discussed)."  Macworld 1 April 1995
 Carlton, Jim. "King Kahng: Master of Cheap Clones May Hold Key to Fate Of Apple Computers --- He Is Making First Copies Of the Fabled Macintosh, Which Risks Sales Loss --- `We Want Him to Succeed'." The Wall Street Journal 14 April 1995
 Rizzo, John. "Clones' corporate clout. (compatibility of upcoming Macintosh clones with PC networks used in business)." MacUser 1 May 1995
 Crabb, Don.  "Note to Power Computing: make portable clones, too. (open letter to Power Computing CEO Stephen Kahng beseeching better portable designs than Apple is producing)."  MacWEEK 15 May 1995
 Moran, Susan.  "Apple seen getting boost from Mac clones in South Korea."  Reuters News 24 September 1995
 Ladendorf, Kirk. "MAKING WAVES; With today's introduction of its PowerWave machines, Power Computing steps up from mere Macintosh clonemaker to technological innovator." Austin American-Statesman 30 October 1995
 Ristelhueber, Robert. "Power Computing banks on aggressive designs and mail order channel. (Company Business and Marketing)."  Electronic Business 1 November 1995
 Ladendorf, Kirk. "Power Computing locates space it needs in Round Rock."  Austin American-Statesman 29 December 1995
 Newsbytes. "Macworld - Power Computing Offers New Mac Clone" 11 January 1996
 Ryer, Kelly and Pearlstein, Joanna. "Power halts meltdown after operations crisis."  MacWeek 25 March 1996
 Carlton, Jim.  "Power Computing Gains Towering Presence as Cloner --- CEO `King Kahng' Snatches Some of Apple's Revenue as It Copies the Mac."  The Wall Street Journal 20 May 1996
 Burrows, Peter. "Up Front: SILICON SAGAS APPLE COULD LEARN AT ITS CLONE'S FEET."  Business Week 5 August 1996
 Walsh, Jeff.  "Apple freezes Mac OS May halt licensing OS to third parties."  InfoWorld 25 August 1997
 Ortiz, Catalina. "Apple buying Macintosh clone maker Power Computing for $100 million." AP Newswires 2 September 1997
 Markoff, John.  "Apple Decides Cloning Isn't Its Route Back To Profitability."  The New York Times Section D; Business/Financial Desk 3 September 1997

External links
All Power Computing Mac Clones (at EveryMac.com)
Power Computing: Fighting Back for the Mac or Stealing Apple’s Customers?
Power Computing ads

1998 mergers and acquisitions
American companies established in 1993
American companies disestablished in 1998
Apple Inc. acquisitions
Computer companies established in 1993
Computer companies disestablished in 1998
Defunct computer companies of the United States
Defunct computer hardware companies
Macintosh clones